Baryrhynchus is a genus of beetle in the family Brentidae.

Species 
Baryrhynchus contains the following species:

Baryrhynchus (Baryrhynchus) Lacordaire, 1865
 Baryrhynchus andamanicus Power, 1879
 Baryrhynchus angulatus Zhang, 1993
 Baryrhynchus anthracinus Kleine, 1916
 Baryrhynchus bengalensis Kleine, 1937
 Baryrhynchus concretus Zhang, 1993
 Baryrhynchus convexus Zhang, 1993
 Baryrhynchus cratus Zhang, 1993
 Baryrhynchus dehiscens  (Gyllenhal, 1833) 
 Baryrhynchus discolor Kleine, 1916
 Baryrhynchus latirostris  (Gyllenhal, 1833) 
 Baryrhynchus merocephalus Kleine, 1916
 Baryrhynchus miles  (Boheman, 1845) 
 Baryrhynchus minisulus Zhang, 1993
 Baryrhynchus nitidus Zhang, 1993
 Baryrhynchus odontus Zhang, 1993
 Baryrhynchus phaeus Zhang, 1993
 Baryrhynchus planus Zhang, 1993
 Baryrhynchus rudis Senna, 1893
 Baryrhynchus setulosus Zhang, 1993
 Baryrhynchus speciosissimus Kleine, 1916
 Baryrhynchus umbraticus Kleine, 1916
 Baryrhynchus yaeyamensis Morimoto, 1979
Baryrhynchus (Eupsalomimus) Kleine, 1916
 Baryrhynchus lineicollis Power, 1879
 Baryrhynchus poweri Roelofs, 1879
 Baryrhynchus tokarensis Ohbayashi and Satô, 1966
Unclear subgenera
 Baryrhynchus smetsi Goossens, 2008

References 

Brentidae
Beetles described in 1865